James Tora (born 16 July 1956 in Hunuta Village, Ugi Islands) is a Solomon Islands politician.

After studying at the Honiara Technical Institute, he worked as Supervising Manager for Student Welfare Services at the Solomon Islands College of Higher Education. He then began a career in national politics, when he stood successfully for Parliament in the 1 December 2004 by-election in the Ugi/Ulawa constituency. (The by-election was prompted by MP Nathaniel Waena's elevation to the post of Governor-General.) He was re-elected in the 2006 and 2010 general elections.

He first entered Cabinet in March 2005 when Prime Minister Sir Allan Kemakeza appointed him Minister for National Reconciliation, Unity and Peace, in the wake of the severe ethnic conflict on Guadalcanal. He held the post until February 2006, when he was appointed Minister for Mines and Energy. Following the April 2006 general election, he became Minister for Infrastructure and Development in Prime Minister Snyder Rini's short-lived Cabinet. Rini resigned the following month, under public pressure and in the face of an impending motion of no confidence, and Tora found himself on the Opposition benches, where he remained until Rini's successor, Manasseh Sogavare, was himself ousted in a vote of no confidence in December 2007. Tora supported new Prime Minister Derek Sikua, and was appointed Minister for Home Affairs. He held the post until May 2009, when he was transferred to the position of Minister for Police, National Security, and Correctional Services. He continued at that post after the August 2010 election, under newly elected Prime Minister Danny Philip.

On 25 January 2011, he followed several other ministers in resigning from government and joining Steve Abana's Opposition. Tora's defection gave Abana the support of twenty-five MPs to Philip's twenty-three, prompting the Opposition to call for Philip's resignation. The following month, however, Tora and several other defectors returned to the government, providing Philip with a solid majority once more. Tora resumed his position as Minister for Police.

On 18 April, Philip removed him from Cabinet in a reshuffle to make way for five Opposition members who had just joined the government ranks. Sofu was succeeded by Clay Forau.

In early November, Tora, along with several other former ministers who had lost their positions in that reshuffle, switched over to the Opposition again, and this time succeeded in bringing down the Philip government.

References

1956 births
Living people
Members of the National Parliament of the Solomon Islands
People from Makira-Ulawa Province
Solomon Islands Democratic Party politicians
Mining ministers of the Solomon Islands
Energy ministers of the Solomon Islands
Interior ministers of the Solomon Islands
Justice ministers of the Solomon Islands